{{DISPLAYTITLE:C25H27N}}
The molecular formula C25H27N (molar mass: 341.49 g/mol, exact mass: 341.2143 u) may refer to:

 JWH-184
 JWH-196